HD 139357 is a 6th magnitude K-type giant star located approximately 370 light years from Earth, visible in the constellation Draco. Its mass is four thirds that of the Sun but its radius is 11.47 times larger. However, despite being a giant star, it is only 3.07 billion years old, which is younger than the Sun.

A 2022 study estimated the true mass of HD 139357 b at about  via astrometry, although this estimate is poorly constrained. If this is the true mass, the object would be a brown dwarf.

See also 
 42 Draconis
 Iota Draconis
 List of extrasolar planets

References 

K-type giants
Planetary systems with one confirmed planet
Draco (constellation)
Durchmusterung objects
139357
076311
5811